Patoda is a tehsil in Beed subdivision of Beed district, Maharashtra state, India.

Features

Paramount Solar Park is a solar energy park in Patoda. It is the largest private-sector solar park approved by the Solar Energy Corporation of India (SECI) under the Jawaharlal Nehru National Solar Mission in India. The park is proposed to have a capacity of 500 MW. Maharashtra has received bids for tariffs of Rs 4.42 per kWh in 2016, and it is expected the rates will decrease by the time K. P. Power – Paramount Solar Park is completed.
It has Asia's first peacock sanctuary established in Naygaon. Also there is a famous waterfall at Sautada in Patoda Taluka.

See also 
 Ultra Mega Solar Power Projects
 Solar Energy Corporation of India
 Ministry of New and Renewable Energy
 Jawaharlal Nehru National Solar Mission

References 

Solar power stations in Maharashtra
Beed district
Photovoltaic power stations in India
 Cities and towns in Beed district
 Talukas in Maharashtra